Haplochromis boops is a species of cichlid endemic to Lake Victoria.  This species can reach a length of  SL.

References

boops
Fish described in 1967
Fish of Lake Victoria
Taxonomy articles created by Polbot